Kaadhal is a 2004 Indian Tamil-language romantic drama film based on a true story, directed by Balaji Sakthivel, starring Bharath (in his first film as a main lead actor) and Sandhya. It was produced by S. Shankar and featured music composed by Joshua Sridhar. The film opened on 17 December 2004 to critical acclaim and was a high commercial success. The film was dubbed into Telugu as Premisthe. It was remade in Kannada as Cheluvina Chittara in 2007, in Bengali as Chirodini Tumi Je Amar in 2008, in Bengali Bangladesh as Nogor Mastan in 2015, in Marathi as Ved Laavi Jeeva in 2010, in Nepali as Manjari in 2013 and in Punjabi as Ramta Jogi in 2015.

Plot 
Murugan is a diligent scooter mechanic in Madurai, and life goes on smoothly for him until a rich student Aishwarya sets an eye on him. The infatuation reaches a dangerous level when she coaxes Murugan to take her from the constraint of her family, who has other plans about her future. Initially, Murugan hesitates to love her as she belongs to a rich family and caste issues but later understands her true love and reciprocates. The couple knows that Aishwarya's family will not agree for the wedding and decides to run away to Chennai. Murugan's friend Stephen helps them in their hour of crisis, and the lovers unite in marriage. But Aishwarya's family dotes on her and is not going to give up so easily.

The family tracks down the couple and reaches Chennai to meet them. But the family members pretend to have agreed on the wedding and convince them to return to Madurai along with them. On the way back to Madurai, the family members take the couple to their farmland where Aishwarya's relatives have gathered. They all beat Murugan, and Aishwarya's father wants her to remove the mangalyam tied by Murugan. Aishwarya fears that if she does not obey her father, then Murugan will be killed, so she agrees to marry another man to save Murugan's life. Murugan is beaten and let go of the place.

After a few years, Aishwarya, while travelling with her husband and her child, comes across Murugan, where she finds him as a mentally deranged beggar roaming near a traffic signal. Aishwarya faints upon realizing that the man is Murugan and gets admitted to the nearby hospital. At night, she runs from the hospital to the same signal in search of Murugan, and she finds him sitting there. Aishwarya cries to Murugan and feels bad that she was responsible for his pathetic situation. Aishwarya's husband also comes to the spot and understands his wife's situation. He admits Murugan in a mental health centre and also takes care of him.

The movie ends with title cards mentioning that this is a true incident narrated by the girl's husband to the director during a train journey, which prompted him to make a film.

Cast 

 Bharath as Murugan
 Sandhya as Aishwarya
 Sukumar as Stephen
 Dhandapani as Rajendran
 S. Krishna Murthy as Aishwarya's uncle
 Arun Kumar as Murugan's assistant
 Saravanan as aspiring director Bhagya
 Saranya as Sathya
 Soori as Mansion mate
 Pallu Babu as Viruchagakanth
 Muthuraman as Dhanasekaran
 Sivakumar as Aishwarya's husband
 Sridhar special appearance in the song "Pura Koondu"

Production 
After the average response of his debut film Samurai (2002), Balaji was supposed to direct again Vikram in a new venture which was later shelved. During the shoot of Anniyan (2005), Balaji narrated the plot of Kaadhal to his mentor Shankar who agreed to produce the film after hearing the script.

The film was initially turned down by actors Dhanush and Shanthanu Bhagyaraj, before Balaji Sakthivel consulted Shankar's advice for the lead role. Telugu actor Ram also auditioned for the lead role but was unsuccessful. After considering both Manikandan and Bharath from the cast of Boys (2003), Shankar chose the latter to star in his production. For the female lead, the makers held discussions with Ileana D'Cruz and then Varalaxmi Sarathkumar, but the latter's father was reluctant to let her become an actress at the time. The team then picked Saranya Nag was in Class IX, when cinematographer Vijay Milton referred her on to Balaji Sakthivel. She was initially considered to play the heroine in the film, but the role was later handed to Sandhya, after the director felt Saranya looked too young, Saranya later was chosen for the character of Sandhya's friend. Dhandapani from Madurai was selected to play Sandhya's father. He became popular with this film and adopted the film's title as Kaadhal Dhandapani.

Though the story was shown to have taken place in Madurai, shooting was done in Dindigul and Madurai. The school where Sandhya studies is St. Joseph's Girls Higher Secondary School, Dindigul. The first schedule was completed in 20 days and rest of the scenes were shot at locations in Chennai, Chalakudy and Munnar.

Soundtrack 
The film has eight songs composed by Joshua Sridhar making his debut. Haricharan made his singing debut with this film when he was 17, and went on to record three songs.

Reception 
Visual Dasan of Kalki praised the film for realism and performances. Malathi Rangarajan of The Hindu wrote "Kadhal [..] apart, from the otherwise run of the mill story of calf love, elopement and the consequences thereof. Balaji Saktivel (story, screenplay, dialogue and direction) deserves full credit for the differently conceived drama in the end, where very little is actually said — the body language conveys it all" while praising the film's performances of cast and director's treatment of the film. Malini Mannath of Chennai Online wrote "A short simple tale, an equally simple narrative style, an unassuming lead pair with their people next-door looks, and some well coordinated performances all make for some fairly engaging viewing in ‘Kadhal’."

Box office 
Produced on a budget of ₹1.25 crores, the film was a surprise blockbuster at box-office recovering almost its entire budget from Chennai distribution territory.

Legacy 
The film's success catapulted Bharath and Sandhya to fame, they went on to become popular. The film's screenplay was released in the form of a book in 2005.

References

Further reading

External links 
 

2000s Tamil-language films
2004 films
2004 romantic drama films
Films directed by Balaji Sakthivel
Films scored by Joshua Sridhar
Films shot in Madurai
Indian romantic drama films
Romantic drama films based on actual events
Tamil films remade in other languages